The 2021 Washington wildfire season officially began in March 2021. By late April, all of Eastern Washington had been classified by the United States Drought Monitor as "abnormally dry" with moderate to severe drought conditions. The state had more than 630 wildfires by the first week of July, on par with the state's record 2015 wildfire season.

Washington State Department of Natural Resources (DNR) reported the end of the fire season by October 12, and the DNR and the Northwest Interargency Fire Center reported zero fires in the state on October 14.

Fires

List of notable fires
The following is a list of fires that burned more than 1,000 acres (400 ha), or produced significant structural damage or casualties.

Timeline of events
The month of April had more fires than the previous year, and a year-to-date record 410 fires occurred on state-managed lands by the second week of June.

The Joseph Canyon Fire burned on both sides of the Oregon–Washington border during June. It was ignited by lightning during the night of June 3–4.

The Hair Road Fire in Walla Walla County south of Lower Monumental Dam grew to 10,000 acres before being contained on June 21.

A brush fire near Lind in Adams County was ignited on the morning of June 27 and grew to 20,000 acres the same day. It resulted in the closure of Washington State Route 21. By June 29, it was 100% contained.

The Cedar Hills Fire began on June 28 near the Seattle suburb of Issaquah and grew to over 30 acres, involving Eastside Fire and Rescue and state firefighting resources. 

Smoke from British Columbia fires that occurred during the 2021 Western North America heat wave began to enter Washington in early July.

The Batterman Fire in Douglas County near East Wenatchee began on Independence Day in the hills above Pangborn Memorial Airport. By July 6, it had burned , and many residents had been ordered to evacuate. Batterman Road and Rock Island Grade Road along Rock Island Creek were closed.

The governor declared a state of emergency on July 6.

The 300+ acre Andrus Road fire in the Spokane suburbs drew firefighters from as far away as Thurston and Lewis County in Western Washington, hundreds of miles away.

Lightning on July 7 ignited many fires in Eastern Washington including the Asotin Complex Fire near Clarkston which grew to several hundred acres before the end of the day. The Dry Gulch Fire, part of the complex, grew to over 38,000 acres by July 10 and was burning in rugged terrain with heavy fuels. By July 12, it had reached 55,055 acres. The Lick Creek and Dry Gulch fires were administratively merged on July 12, with a combined  reported July 14. By July 22, the Lick Creek Fire was 76,167 acres in size. By July 26, it was 90% contained.

On July 12, the Burbank Fire burning around Burbank Creek in the Yakima River Canyon and extending into the Yakima Training Center reached . It was declared contained on July 14 after 13,000 acres burned.

A portion of the North Cascades Highway was closed due to the Cedar Creek Fire on July 12. It was to remain closed for at least several days as the Varden Fire nearby grew to several hundred acres. The fires merged and reached 2,900 acres on July 15. The fire grew to 18,634 acres by July 21, to 20,806 acres by July 23, and had grown to 52,030 acres by August 4.

Until July, no heavy smoke events had impacted ground-level air quality in the state's largest cities of Seattle and Spokane in Western Washington and Eastern Washington respectively, but there was the possibility of smoke entering the state from large Western fires like the Oregon Bootleg Fire. On July 13, Spokane media reported smoke had begun to affect the air, becoming "unhealthy for some".

By July 22, it was almost 6,000 acres, and by July 26, it was 11,256 acres.

The fire grew to 22,900 acres by July 15, and over 37,000 acres by July 16; the town of Keller, Washington was also evacuated. The fire was 97% contained by August 9.

U.S. Route 97 Alternate was closed on July 14 due to the fire. The fire grew to 9,000 acres on July 14 and people in over 1,000 homes were told to evacuate. On July 15 it was 11,000 acres, and evacuations were ordered for 1,500 homes. It was 90% contained by July 19.

The Cub Creek 2 Fire broke out north of Winthrop in the Okanogan-Wenatchee National Forest and Washington DNR lands on July 16. Evacuations were ordered around Winthrop on July 17.
It grew to 4,690 acres by the end of the day on July 18, affecting air quality in Twisp and elsewhere in the Methow Valley. The air quality index in Twisp was rated hazardous on July 19. On the morning of July 20, the fire had grown to 32,473 acres and was 5% contained. Two dwellings were destroyed by July 20.

All state forest lands in Eastern Washington were closed to the public on July 20 due to fire danger.

Due to ongoing and widespread PM particulate content in the air from multiple wildfires, children, the very old or pregnant, and other residents with respiratory conditions in parts of Okanogan County were advised in July to leave the area for their health. Air quality in the Methow Valley was the unhealthiest in the nation at several points in July. The U.S. National Weather Service Spokane office tweeted that Methow Valley's air quality could be the worst anywhere on the Earth on July 23.

The Schneider Springs Fire rose near Naches, Washington during a thunderstorm  on August 4. It caused poor air quality across Eastern Washington and in Puget Sound region around August 12. By August 18 it had grown to 31,868 acres.

The Twenty-Five Mile Fire started near Twenty-Five Mile Creek State Park on August 15.

References

External links
Earth from Orbit: Record Heat and Drought is Raising Wildfire Risk, NOAA National Environmental Satellite Data and Information Service

External links
Washington wildfires Washington State Department of Natural Resources

Wildfires
 
2021